Hisøy (historically: Hisø) is a former municipality in the old Aust-Agder county in Norway.  The  municipality existed from 1881 until 1992 when it was merged into the municipality of Arendal in what is now Agder county. At the time of its dissolution, it was the smallest municipality in the whole county. The municipality encompassed the islands of Hisøya, Gjervoldsøy, Havsøya, Ærøya, Store Torungen, Lille Torungen, and several other small, unpopulated islands. The administrative centre was the village of Kolbjørnsvik on Hisøya island.

Hisøy Church was the main church for the municipality, located in the village of His in the central part of Hisøya.

History
The municipality of Hisø was created on 1 January 1881 when the municipality of Øyestad was split into Øyestad (population: 4,474) and Hisø (population: 2,652). On 1 January 1992, there was a major municipal merger involving Hisøy. The municipalities of Hisøy (population: 4,026), Tromøy (population: 4,711), Øyestad (population: 8,679), Moland (population: 8,148), and the town of Arendal (population: 12,478) all merged, forming a new, much larger municipality of Arendal.

Name
The municipality (originally the parish) is named Hisøy (or Hisø) after the old His farm since this is where the Hisøy Church is located. The first element, His, means "the cut" (probably referring to how the river Nidelva turns near the island) and the last element is ø or øy which means "island".

Coat of arms
The coat of arms for Hisøy municipality was granted on 12 December 1986 and it was in use until 31 December 1991 when the municipality ceased to exist. The official blazon is "Gules, two lighthouses argent issuant from the base". This means the arms have a red field (background) and the charge is two twin lighthouses. The lighthouses have a tincture of argent which means they are commonly colored white, but if the arms are made out of metal, then silver is used. The lighthouses were chosen to represent the two local lighthouses: Store Torungen Lighthouse and Lille Torungen Lighthouse which mark the waters around the island of Hisøya and the entrance to the harbour for the town of Arendal. The arms were designed by Thorleif Bredesen.

Government
All municipalities in Norway, including Hisøy, are responsible for primary education (through 10th grade), outpatient health services, senior citizen services, unemployment and other social services, zoning, economic development, and municipal roads. The municipality was governed by a municipal council of elected representatives, which in turn elected a mayor.

Municipal council
The municipal council  of Hisøy was made up of representatives that were elected to four year terms.  The party breakdown of the final municipal council was as follows:

Media gallery

See also
List of former municipalities of Norway

References

External links

Arendal
Former municipalities of Norway
1881 establishments in Norway
1992 disestablishments in Norway